Moira Kirland is an American television writer and producer, whose credits include Dark Angel, The Dead Zone, Castle, and Madam Secretary. She is currently serving as a writer on Quantum Leap.

Career 
Kirland began her career in 1992 working as an assistant to the producers of the animated series Capitol Critters and as a producer in 1993 on the independent film Saint Crispen's Day. Between 2000-2005 she worked as writer/producer on Dark Angel, Haunted, The Twilight Zone and The Dead Zone before returning to network television with Medium, where she worked from the first season until the fifth season in 2009. She has since worked on Castle and Arrow.

Kirkland is writer and executive producer of The InBetween (2018) on NBC-TV.″

Dark Angel episodes 
 "Blah Blah Woof Woof" (1.09)
 "Rising" (1.13) (with Jose Molina, David Zabel, Doris Egan)
 "Hit a Sisa Back" (1.20)
 "Designate This" (2.01)
 "Boo" (2.05) (with Charles H. Eglee)
 "The Berrisford Agenda" (2.11)
 "Exposure" (2.16)
 "Love Among the Runes" (2.20) (with Jose Molina)

Medium episodes 
 "Coming Soon" (1.06)
 "Coded" (1.09)
 "Penny for Your Thoughts" (1.15)
 "Sweet Dreams" (2.05)
 "The Reckoning" (2.10)
 "Sweet Child O' Mine" (2.15)
 "Ghost in the Machine" (3.05)
 "Mother's Little Helper" (3.07)
 "The Boy Next Door" (3.15)
 "Head Games" (3.20) (with Javier Grillo-Marxuach and Robert Doherty)
 "Girls Ain't Nothing but Trouble" (4.05)
 "Drowned World" (4.16)
 "A Taste of Her Own Medicine" (5.05)

Castle episodes 
 "Ghosts" (1.08)
 "Inventing the Girl" (2.03)
 "Tick, Tick, Tick..." (2.16)
 "He's Dead, She's Dead" (3.02)
 "The Final Nail" (3.15)
 "Kick the Ballistics" (4.04)
 "A Dance with Death" (4.18)

Arrow episodes 
 "An Innocent Man" (1.04) (with Lana Cho)
 "Legacies" (1.06) (with Marc Guggenheim)

Lincoln Rhyme: Hunt for the Bone Collector episodes 
 "Russian Roulette" (1.03)

References

External links 

American television writers
American television producers
American women television producers
Living people
Place of birth missing (living people)
American women television writers
Year of birth missing (living people)
21st-century American women